The Lumding–Dibrugarh section is a broad-gauge railway line connecting  and . The -long railway line is functional in the Indian state of Assam. It is under the jurisdiction of Northeast Frontier Railway.

History

The Assam Railway and Trading Company Limited was incorporated in 1881. The first metre-gauge locomotive was put into service in Assam in 1882. The -long line from Dibrugarh steamer ghat to Makum was opened to passenger traffic on 16 July 1883. The objective of opening an isolated railway in upper Assam was to link the tea gardens and coalfields to the steamer ghats.

The -wide metre-gauge railway track earlier laid by Assam Bengal Railway from Chittagong to Lumding was extended to Tinsukia on the Dibru–Sadiya line in 1903. The Mariani–Furkating line was operated by Jorhat-Provincial Railway.

The project for the conversion of the entire Lumding–Dibrugarh section from metre gauge to   broad gauge was completed by the end of 1997.

The Guwahati–Lumding–Dibrugarh line was proposed to be doubled in the Railway Budget for 2016–17. The -long Dimapur–Zubza–Kohima new line project has the status of a National Project. Final location survey has been completed for the entire project. As of 2012, surveys are underway for -long line from Tirap to Lekhapani and -long line from Lekhapani to Kharsang in Arunachal Pradesh. Survey for -long new line from Jorhat to Shibsagar was completed in 2010–11. Survey was completed for doubling of -long line from Digaru to Dibrugarh. Survey is in progress for -long new line from Dimapur to Tizit. The survey for -long new line from Tuli to Tuli Town has been shelved.

References 

5 ft 6 in gauge railways in India
Rail transport in Assam
Railway lines opened in 1903
1903 establishments in India
Transport in Dibrugarh
Rail transport in Nagaland
Transport in Lumding